Khanqah Sharif is a city situated west of Bahawalpur District. It is famous for the Shrine of  Khawaja Mohkum ud Deen Serani. There are two shrines of Khawaja Serani. One in Khanqah Sharif, Pakistan and other in India. Saraiki is the major language. Urdu, English, Punjabi and Pushto are also spoken.
The city is over 200 years old and has three Gardens as well as many mosques and schools.Khanqah Sharif

Populated places in Bahawalpur District